Adoxomyia rustica is a species of soldier flies in the family Stratiomyidae.

References

Stratiomyidae
Insects described in 1877
Taxa named by Carl Robert Osten-Sacken
Diptera of North America